Cadwalader Inlet is an ice-filled inlet about  long, indenting the northeast coast of Thurston Island between Evans Peninsula and Lofgren Peninsula. It was discovered on helicopter flights from the USS Burton Island and USS Glacier by personnel of the U.S. Navy Bellingshausen Sea Expedition in February 1960. It was named by the Advisory Committee on Antarctic Names for Captain John Cadwalader, U.S. Navy, chief of staff to U.S. Antarctic Projects Officer and representative of Task Unit Commander aboard the Burton Island in February 1960.

Maps
 Thurston Island – Jones Mountains. 1:500000 Antarctica Sketch Map. US Geological Survey, 1967.
 Antarctic Digital Database (ADD). Scale 1:250000 topographic map of Antarctica. Scientific Committee on Antarctic Research (SCAR). Since 1993, regularly upgraded and updated.

References 

Inlets of Ellsworth Land
Thurston Island